The Joe Horn shooting controversy occurred on November 14, 2007, in Pasadena, Texas, United States, when local resident Joe Horn shot and killed two burglars outside his neighbor's home. Recordings of Horn's exchange with emergency dispatch indicated that he was asked 14 times not to interfere with the burglary, because police would soon be on scene.  The shootings resulted in debates regarding self-defense, Castle Doctrine laws, and Texas laws relating to use of deadly force to prevent or stop property crimes. The undocumented status of both burglars was highlighted because of the U.S. border controversy. On June 30, 2008, Joe Horn was cleared by a grand jury in the Pasadena shootings.

Shooting 
On November 14, 2007, Joe Horn, 61, spotted two men breaking into his next-door neighbor's home in Pasadena, Texas. He called 911 to summon police to the scene. While on the phone with emergency dispatch, Horn stated that he had the right to use deadly force to defend property, referring to a law (Texas Penal Code §§ 9.41, 9.42, and 9.43) which justified the use of deadly force to protect Horn's home. Horn exited his home with his shotgun, while the 911 operator tried to dissuade him from that action several times. On the 911 tape, he is heard confronting the suspects, saying, "Move, and you're dead", immediately followed by the sound of a shotgun blast, followed by two more.  Following the shootings Mr. Horn told the 911 operator, "They came in the front yard with me, man, I had no choice!"

Police initially identified the dead men in Horn's yard as 38-year-old Miguel Antonio DeJesus and 30-year-old Diego Ortiz, both residents of Houston, and of Afro-Latino descent. However, DeJesus was actually an alias of an individual named Hernando Riascos Torres. Torres and Ortiz were carrying a sack with cash and jewelry taken from the home of Joe Horn's next-door neighbor. Both had criminal convictions in Colombia and had been convicted on drug trafficking charges. Police found a Puerto Rican man's identification card on Ortiz. Torres had three identification cards from Colombia, Puerto Rico, and the Dominican Republic, and had been previously sent to prison for dealing cocaine. Torres had been deported in 1999.

An unidentified plainclothes police detective responding to the 911 call arrived at the scene before the shooting, and witnessed the escalation and shootings while remaining in his car. His report on the incident indicated that one of the men who was killed "received gunfire from the rear". Police Capt. A.H. "Bud" Corbett, a spokesman for the Pasadena Police Department, stated that the two men ignored Mr. Horn's order to freeze and that one of the suspects ran towards Horn before angling away from him and toward the street when they were shot in the back. The medical examiner's report could not specify whether they were shot in the back due to the ballistics of the shotgun wound.  Pasadena police confirmed that the two men were shot after they ventured into Horn's front yard. The plain clothes detective did not arrest Horn.

The incident touched off protests, led by Quanell X, leader of the Houston chapter of the New Black Panther Party (NBPP) that were met by counter-protests from Horn's neighbors and other supporters.

911 call transcript 

One vital piece of evidence were segments of Horn's 9-1-1 calls which could have possibly incriminated Horn or shown his innocence. The most scrutinized segment is presented below:

The 911 call ended about 80 seconds after the shots were fired, when officers arrived on the scene.

Joe Horn
Joe Horn is from Houston. When he took an early retirement from AT&T, he moved in with his daughter, Rhonda, and her husband in Kentucky. After his daughter was widowed in 1998 the remainder of the family moved to Houston and Horn went back to work so his daughter could take care of the children. When Rhonda remarried, she and her new husband purchased a home and asked Mr. Horn to move in. In 2003 he accepted and moved in once more.

An only child, Horn graduated from Sam Houston High School in 1964. He went to work as a 7-Eleven store clerk immediately after high school.  Two years afterwards, he started work in the communications industry, eventually working his way up to a computer program manager for AT&T before retiring in 2003.

He was proficient with guns because of hunting, which he lost interest in years before shooting the intruders.

Aftermath

Death threat
A death threat was made anonymously to the district attorney in which the following was said: "Don't worry about my name. But what you better do, you better indict Joe Horn, and you better find him guilty. Because if you don't, somebody is gonna kill him on the outside, and if he goes to prison he's gonna get killed on the inside. It's as simple as that. They waiting on him in prison, and we're waiting on him on the outside. We gonna kill that mother fucker. Bye."

Grand jury
On June 30, 2008 a Harris County grand jury cleared Horn by issuing a no bill after two weeks of testimony.

Reaction
Black activist Quanell X said he was meeting with civil attorneys to discuss the next legal move.  He said he planned to lobby lawmakers to change the  Castle Doctrine, which he believes is racially motivated.  He went on to say, "This was a wild and out-of-control Western-thinking, gun-toting man who saw the opportunity to be judge, jury and executioner, and Harris County let him get away with it. But we're not going to let him get away with it."

On a Sunday in early December 2007,  Quanell X and dozens of members of the group New Black Panther Party planned a march through Pasadena, Texas to protest.

Joseph Gutheinz, a Houston attorney and member of the National Republican Lawyers Association, said: "I wonder if Joe Horn were black if he would be free tonight or in the Harris County Jail." Speaking on the Harris County Grand Jury system, Gutheinz said: "It's a sea of white faces that doesn't look anything like the county."

National reactions
The Glenn Beck Program had conditionally taken up Horn's defense, but allowed that "property isn't worth killing over."

See also

Castle doctrine
Tony Martin (farmer)

References

External links

2007 crimes in the United States
Crimes in Harris County, Texas
2007 in Texas
2007 controversies in the United States
November 2007 events in the United States